Maurice Meyricke (ca. 15631640) was a Welsh academic at the University of Oxford in the sixteenth and seventeenth centuries.

Life
Meyricke, from Anglesey, matriculated from New College, Oxford on 11 May 1582 with a scholarship at the age of 19. He obtained his BA degree on 27 October 1585 and his MA degree on 2 June 1589. He also became a Fellow of New College at about this time. His brother William and half-brother John Meyrick were also educated at New College, Oxford. Maurice was the Registrar of the University of Oxford from 1600 to 1608. He was appointed as a Fellow of Jesus College, Oxford in the royal charter of 1622 issued by James I. He died in 1640.

References

1560s births
1640 deaths
Alumni of New College, Oxford
Fellows of New College, Oxford
Fellows of Jesus College, Oxford
People from Anglesey
Registrars of the University of Oxford
16th-century Welsh writers
16th-century male writers
17th-century Welsh writers
17th-century male writers